João Neves da Fontoura was a Brazilian lawyer, diplomat and politician. He was born in Cachoeira do Sul, Rio Grande do Sul, on 16 November 1887 and died in Rio de Janeiro on 31 March 1963.

Biography 
Fontoura was the son of colonel Isidoro Neves da Fontoura and Adalgisa Godoy da Fontoura. He studied at the Nossa Senhora da Conceição Gymnasium in São Leopoldo. He earned a bachelor's degree from the Faculty of Law of Porto Alegre. He then served as Public Prosecutor of Porto Alegre for one year; as mayor of Cachoeira do Sul from 1925 to 1928; as state deputy from 1921 to 1928; and as vice president of the state of Rio Grande do Sul, elected in 1927. He was federal deputy for the same state, from 1928 to 1930 and from 1935 to 1937. He dedicated himself for some time to journalism, as editor of O Debate of Porto Alegre and Rio Grande of Cachoeira do Sul. In 1907 he founded the magazine Pantum in Porto Alegre.

As leader of the Rio Grande do Sul representation in 1929, he signed the Minas-Rio Grande pact with Francisco Campos, which resulted in the Liberal Alliance. A noted speaker, he was parliamentary leader of the Liberal Alliance in the Chamber of Deputies and one of the leaders of the Revolution of 1930. His speeches of this phase have been published in two volumes, under the title The Liberal Journey.

After 1930, refusing any political office, he became a legal advisor to the Bank of Brazil. In 1940, he was part of the Brazilian delegation to the Havana Conference. In 1942, he received approval from the Government of France to occupy the post of ambassador of Brazil in that country, but the appointment remained unanswered as a result of the occupation of the free zone by German troops.

He was Ambassador of Brazil to Lisbon from 1943 to 1945. As Minister of Foreign Affairs, in 1946, he headed the Delegation of Brazil to the Paris Peace Conference. In 1948, he was the head of the Delegation of Brazil to the IX Inter-American Conference meeting in Bogotá. He delivered the inaugural speech at this conference.

Fontoura was appointed Minister of Foreign Affairs for the second time in January 1951, and occupied this position until July 1953. In 1951, he was delegated from Brazil to the IV Meeting of Consultation of Ministers Foreign Affairs of the American Republics meeting in Washington, in which the problems of political, military and economic cooperation between the said Republics were discussed. Also in 1951, he was the head of the Delegation of Brazil to the Congress of the Latin Union, meeting in Rio de Janeiro, with the chairmanship of the event. In 1952, he headed the delegation of Brazil to the VII United Nations General Assembly, in New York.

Retiring from political life, he returned to journalism, published two volumes of memoirs, Borges de Medeiros e seu tempo and A Aliança Liberal e a Revolução de 30.

He received the title of Doctor Honoris Causa from Columbia University. He was a member of the Riograndense Academy of Letters, corresponding partner of the Academy of Sciences in Lisbon, the Academy of Letters of Uruguay and the Academy of La Lengua of Colombia.

He was the second occupant of Chair 2 at the Brazilian Academy of Letters, to which he was elected on 19 March 1936, in succession to Coelho Neto, and he was received by Academic Fernando Magalhães on 12 June 1937. He received Academics Aníbal Freire da Fonseca and Álvaro Lins.

References

1887 births
1963 deaths
Brazilian diplomats
Foreign ministers of Brazil
Members of the Chamber of Deputies (Brazil) from Rio Grande do Sul
Members of the Legislative Assembly of Rio Grande do Sul
Brazilian essayists
Ambassadors of Brazil to Portugal
Grand Crosses of the Order of Saint James of the Sword